Moríñigo is a municipality located in the province of Salamanca, Castile and León, Spain.As of 2016the municipality has a population of 102 inhabitants.

References

Municipalities in the Province of Salamanca